Boards of Intermediate and secondary education in Pakistan are responsible for conducting intermediate and secondary education examinations. These boards set their educational policy under the supervision of the provincial education ministry. 
This list of education boards in Pakistan shows their year of establishment, jurisdictions (districts) and websites, arranged alphabetically.

Government boards

Intermediate and secondary education boards
Islamabad

Punjab

Sindh

Khyber Pakhtunkhwa

Balochistan

Azad Jammu and Kashmir

Technical education boards

Private boards

Intermediate and secondary education boards

Technical education boards

Religious education boards

Other boards

References

Pakistan education-related lists